Cas-en-Bas is a  settlement in Saint Lucia; it is located in the northern part of the island.

Populated coastal places in Saint Lucia
Towns in Saint Lucia